is a Japanese football midfielder who plays for Cerezo Osaka in the J1 League.

National team career
In August 2016, Harakawa was elected Japan U-23 national team for 2016 Summer Olympics. At this tournament, he played 1 match against Nigeria in first match.

Club statistics
Updated to 24 February 2019.

1Includes Emperor's Cup.
2Includes J. League Cup.

Honours

International
Japan U-23
 AFC U-23 Championship: 2016

References

External links

Profile at Sagan Tosu

1993 births
Living people
Association football people from Yamaguchi Prefecture
Japanese footballers
J1 League players
J2 League players
J3 League players
Kyoto Sanga FC players
Ehime FC players
Kawasaki Frontale players
J.League U-22 Selection players
Sagan Tosu players
Footballers at the 2014 Asian Games
Footballers at the 2016 Summer Olympics
Olympic footballers of Japan
Association football midfielders
Asian Games competitors for Japan